The 1905 Chicago Physicians and Surgeons football team was an American football team that represented the College of Physicians and Surgeons of Chicago  in the 1905 college football season. Their only game was a 0–30 loss against Illinois.

Schedule

References

Chicago Physicians and Surgeons
Chicago Physicians and Surgeons football seasons
College football winless seasons
Chicago Physicians and Surgeons football